Scott: Scott Walker Sings Songs from his T.V. Series is an album by the American solo artist Scott Walker. It was released in June 1969 and reached number seven on the UK Albums Chart, his last album to make the top 10. No singles were released from the album, though some editions include Walker's top-twenty single; "Lights of Cincinnati". The album does not include original compositions by Walker and consists of performances of ballads and big band standards. The album has since been deleted and has not been reissued.

The album is an accompaniment to his BBC TV series Scott. It features studio re-recordings of a selection of music performed on the show and does not feature any original live recordings from the TV show.

Availability
The continued unavailability of Scott: Scott Walker Sings Songs from his T.V. Series is believed to be due to Walker's dissatisfaction with the album and his albums from the early 1970s, which he describes in the documentary Scott Walker: 30 Century Man as his "wilderness years". Walker has blocked CD re-releases of the TV Series album, The Moviegoer (1972) and Any Day Now (1973).

In spite of the album's deletion, around half of the songs were released in recent years on the budget The Collection compilation and Classics & Collectibles (2005). "I Have Dreamed," "Country Girl," "When the World Was Young," "Someone to Light Up My Life," "The Impossible Dream," "If She Walked Into My Life," "Who (Will Take My Place)" and "Lost in the Stars" are included on Classics & Collectibles, while "The Look of Love" is included on The Collection. "Will You Still Be Mine," "The Song Is You" and "Only the Young" remain unavailable.

Reception

Scott: Scott Walker Sings Songs from his T.V. Series received mixed reviews by the majority of critics.

Gordon Coxhill of New Musical Express wrote, "This LP, totally different from anything he's ever done before, is just as creative, just as professional and perhaps more entertaining than his previous works." A less positive review from the staff of Melody Maker stated that Walker "lacks the magic of the big league male singers" and that "he cannot be faulted on his choice of material — he handles some magnificent modern songs — but his slightly nasal singing palls before the record is over." Richie Unterberger, writing retrospectively for Allmusic, reviews the album positively, remarking that Walker sings the heavily orchestrated and middle of the road material extremely well throughout. Despite this, he calls the album not all that representative of what he was usually recording at the time, and certainly not his best work of the period. He summarises the album as a curiosity that's far less enduring than his other albums of the late '60s and early '70s, and is only recommended to completist fans of the singer.

Track listing

Release history

Personnel
Scott Walker – Vocals
John Franz – Producer
Peter Knight –  Music Director of accompaniment 
Peter Olliff – engineer
Peter Rand – Photography
Linda Glover – Design

Charts

References

External links

Scott Walker (singer) albums
1969 albums
Albums arranged by Peter Knight (composer)
Albums produced by Johnny Franz
Philips Records albums